Seek Shelter is the fifth studio album by Danish punk rock band Iceage. It was released on 7 May 2021, by Mexican Summer. A post-punk album with classic rock and Britpop influences, Seek Shelter experiments with diverse sounds that recalls the music of the Pogues, the Replacements, the Rolling Stones, and the Velvet Underground. Upon release, the album was met with widespread critical acclaim with praise towards its eclectic sound and poetic lyricism.

Background and release 
Seek Shelter follows Iceage's 2018 album, Beyondless. Recorded in "lengthy" sessions in Namouche Studios in Lisbon, Portugal, the album was produced by Iceage in collaboration with Sonic Boom of Spacemen 3 and their longtime collaborator Nis Bysted. The album features guest appearances from guitarist Casper Morilla Fernandez and the Lisboa Gospel Collective. It was mixed by Shawn Everett. The record was announced in February 2021, alongside the cover-art and tracklist. The album closer "The Holding Hand" was served as the first single from the album on 2 February. "Vendetta" was released as the album's second single on 17 February. The title track was delivered as the third and final single from the album on 24 March. Seek Shelter was released on 7 May 2021 by Mexican Summer.

Critical reception 

At Metacritic, which assigns a weighted average rating out of 100 to reviews from mainstream publications, this release received an average score of 86, based on nine reviews, indicating "universal acclaim". At AnyDecentMusic?, which collates album reviews from websites, magazines and newspapers, they gave the release a 8.1 out of 13, based on a critical consensus of 13 reviews.

Pitchfork writer Stuart Berman selected Seek Shelter as one of the best rock records of its release week, and wrote that it "completes [Iceage]'s transformation from grim-faced nihilists to wearied soothsayers" while also retaining their "restless spirit". Matthew Ritchie of Exclaim! called the album a "stunning achievement". He praised it for showcasing Iceage as "refusing to be pigeonholed and instead reaching out — exploring life, love and the lack thereof — and ending up exactly where they should be." Gigwises Adam England praised the album as Iceage's "most accessible record yet". Labelling it as "a rollercoaster ride of diverse influences", Joe Goggins from DIY commended the experimentation with eclectic sounds and "earnest" lyricism. 

Lizzie Manno of Paste lauded Rønnenfelt's lyricism which she described as "evocative yet elusive" and felt "deliberately impressionistic", calling the album "a statement of tireless reinvention". NMEs Patrick Clarke viewed it as "a record overflowing in grandeur, a vast emotional release after a decade spent coiled like a spring". Laim Martin of AllMusic opined that the album showcases the band's "flair for the theatric, leaving their scrappy beginnings firmly behind", and concluded that Seek Shelter is "a triumph for the band, born out of strange times, and although it may not be their best, their blend of bitter and sweet still rings true".

Track listing 
All lyrics are written by Elias Bender Rønnenfelt; all music is composed by Iceage; and all tracks are produced by Sonic Boom, Nis Bysted, and Iceage.

Personnel
Credits adapted from Tidal.

 Iceage – primary vocals, producer 
 Sonic Boom – producer, writer 
 Nis Bysted – producer, writer 
 Elias Bender Rønnenfelt – writer 
 Gospel Collective – vocals 
 Emil Thompsen – mastering, studio personnel 
 Shawn Everett – mixings, studio personnel 
 Nils Gröndahl – violin 
 Anders P. Jensen – piano 
 Ned Ferm – saxophone 
 Mads Hyne – trombone 
 Kasper Tranberg – trumpet

Charts

References 

2021 albums
Iceage albums
Mexican Summer albums